Girl is the sixth studio album by Australian alternative rock band Magic Dirt. The album was released on 5 July 2008. The album features ten new songs already familiar to their fans from rigorous road testing on tours through the past year.

To promote the album, the band embarked on their biggest national tour to date; completing a 42-date run across Australia between July and December 2008.

Track listing
All songs written & arranged by Magic Dirt.

 "Get Ready to Die" - 2:25
 "Emerald Green" - 2:26
 "Romy" - 3:38
 "Six Feet Under" - 3:38
 "Always" - 4:29
 "White Boy" - 5:25
 "Full of Rope" - 3:36
 "Tremor" - 2:29
 "Cupids Bow" - 8:17
 "More" - 5:43

Charts
The album was released on 5 July 2008, and debuted at number 7 on the Australian Independent Music chart.

Personnel
Adalita Srsen – vocals, guitar, piano
Dean Turner – bass, vocals
Adam Robertson – drums
Raúl Sánchez – guitar, vocals

Release history

References

2008 albums
Magic Dirt albums
Self-released albums